Birgitta Kumlien-Nyheim  (born 1942, citizen of Norway) is an established fine artist and abstract painter. Her paintings have been exhibited over the last decades in Europe and North America.  Her work is strong and has a bold expressive quality combined with fine sensitivity.  She currently lives and works in Italy and Norway

Education 
Birgitta Kumlien-Nyheim was born in Sweden, but grew up in Rome (Italy).  She received a Bachelor of Arts in modern languages at the University of Stockholm, a diploma at L’Accademia delle Belle Arti in Rome, and a degree at the University of Oslo in Art history.  In her adult life she lived in Japan, Norway, Italy, Spain and Canada. This international exposure has brought forth the rich expressive quality of her paintings.

Selected solo exhibitions 
Galleri Kampen (Oslo, Norway) in 2002, 2004, 2006, 2009;
Hurum Kunstlag (Holmsbu, Norway) in 2007;
Christianssands Kunstforening(Kristiansand, Norway) in 2006;
Fundacion Colegio del Rey, Casa de la Entrevista, Alkala’ de Henares (Madrid, Spain) in 2001;
Galeria Edurne(Madrid, Spain) in 1999;
Clockworthy Art Centre (Belfast, Northern Ireland) in 1997;
Ormond Gallery (Dublin, Ireland) in 1996;
Palazzo Ruspoli (Rome, Italy) 1993;
La Galerie Rodrigue Le May (Ottawa, Canada) in 1990; and
Oslo Kunstforening (Oslo, Norway) in 1987.

Quotes from the Artist 
“In my paintings I try to express our so called “other world”, our deep instinctive nature, our longing for spirituality and our need to unite these two worlds, the invisible with the visible, our dreams and life's realities.”

“To succeed with a painting is when there is change and that happens when I have said a thorough and defenceless yes to myself.”

“To succeed with an exhibition is for me when the viewer finds response in my paintings for our common universal feelings which acknowledge us as human beings and which make that I am you and you are me, like in a mirror, mine or your own.”

1942 births
Living people
Norwegian artists
Swedish artists